Inside the Electric Circus is the third studio album by heavy metal band W.A.S.P., released in October 1986 through Capitol Records; a remastered edition featuring two bonus tracks was reissued in 1997 through Snapper Music. The album is the band's first to feature singer and bandleader Blackie Lawless playing guitar, having switched from bass to rhythm guitar. It reached No. 60 on the US Billboard 200 chart, where it remained for 19 weeks.

Critical reception

Greg Prato at AllMusic gave Inside The Electric Circus three stars out of five, calling it "[an attempt] to grow musically with each successive release". Canadian journalist Martin Popoff considered the album "slightly more simplified and hard rock-based" than previous works and reminded in his review how Lawless "in retrospect considered this record a failure."

Lawless himself has been critical of Inside The Electric Circus, going as far as to name it his least favorite W.A.S.P. album, calling it a "tired record done by a tired band".

Track listing

Personnel
W.A.S.P.
Blackie Lawless – lead vocals, rhythm guitar, producer
Chris Holmes – lead guitar
Johnny Rod – bass, background vocals
Steve Riley – drums, background vocals

Production
Duane Baron, Alex Woltman – engineers
Hans Peter Huber, Kevin Lehue – additional engineering
Michael Wagener, Garth Richardson – mixing
George Marino – mastering at Sterling Sound, New York

Charts

Album

Singles

References

W.A.S.P. albums
1986 albums
Capitol Records albums
Albums produced by Blackie Lawless